The Daniel Hunt Three-Decker is a historic triple decker house in the Main South neighborhood of Worcester, Massachusetts.  It is well preserved representative of the housing boom that took place in the area in the 1880s and 1890s, with significant early Queen Anne styling.  It was built in 1890, and its first owner was Daniel Hunt, a machinist who lived next door.  The building follows a typical side hall plan, with a side wall jog and an asymmetrical facade.  The left side is a row of porches with turned balusters and posts, and the right consists of a bay that projects the full depth of the porch.  The roof is a shallow hip roof, with an extended eave that has curved support brackets.

The building was listed on the National Register of Historic Places in 1990.

See also
National Register of Historic Places listings in southwestern Worcester, Massachusetts
National Register of Historic Places listings in Worcester County, Massachusetts

References

Apartment buildings in Worcester, Massachusetts
Apartment buildings on the National Register of Historic Places in Massachusetts
Queen Anne architecture in Massachusetts
Houses completed in 1890
Triple-decker apartment houses
National Register of Historic Places in Worcester, Massachusetts
1890 establishments in Massachusetts